Lagomorpha is an order of placental mammals, comprising the hares, rabbits, and pikas. Members of this order are called lagomorphs. It currently comprises 93 extant species, which are grouped into 12 genera. Lagomorphs live on every major landmass and in a variety of habitats, especially forests, grasslands, shrublands, and rocky areas. They are generally small in size and come in two main groupings of body plans, the larger rabbit group and smaller pika group, ranging overall from the 11 cm (4 in) long Gansu pika to the 76 cm (30 in) long desert hare. The domestic rabbit subspecies of the European rabbit has been domesticated, resulting in a worldwide distribution.

Lagomorpha is divided into two families: Leporidae, comprising the hares and rabbits; and Ochotonidae, or the pikas. The 64 extant species of Leporidae are divided into 11 genera, though the majority of the species are placed into Lepus (hares) and Sylvilagus (cottontail rabbits); the 29 extant species of Ochotonidae are grouped into a single genus, Ochotona. The exact organization of the species is not fixed, with many recent proposals made based on molecular phylogenetic analysis. No lagomorph species have recently gone extinct, though some species are endangered and the riverine rabbit is critically endangered.

Conventions
Range maps are provided wherever possible; if a range map is not available, a description of the collective range of species in that genera is provided. Ranges are based on the International Union for Conservation of Nature (IUCN) Red List of Threatened Species unless otherwise noted. All extinct genera or species listed alongside extant species went extinct after 1500 CE, and are indicated by a dagger symbol "".

Classification

The order Lagomorpha consists of 93 extant species belonging to 12 genera. This does not include hybrid species or extinct prehistoric species. Modern molecular studies indicate that the 12 genera can be grouped into 2 families.

Family Leporidae
 Genus Brachylagus (pygmy rabbit): one species
 Genus Bunolagus (riverine rabbit): one species
 Genus Caprolagus (hispid hare): one species
 Genus Lepus (hares): 32 species
 Genus Nesolagus (striped rabbits): two species
 Genus Oryctolagus (European rabbit): one species
 Genus Pentalagus (Amami rabbit): one species
 Genus Poelagus (Bunyoro rabbit): one species
 Genus Pronolagus (red rock hares): four species
 Genus Romerolagus (volcano rabbit): one species
 Genus Sylvilagus (cottontail rabbits): 19 species

Family Ochotonidae
 Genus Ochotona (pikas): 29 species

Lagomorphs
The following classification is based on the taxonomy described by the reference work Mammal Species of the World (2005), with augmentation by generally accepted proposals made since using molecular phylogenetic analysis, as supported by both the IUCN and the American Society of Mammalogists.

Family Leporidae

Members of the Leporidae family are called leporids, or colloquially hares and rabbits. Leporidae comprises 73 extant species, divided into 11 genera.

Family Ochotonidae

Members of the Ochotonidae family are called ochotonids, or colloquially pikas. Ochotonidae comprises 34 extant species, which are all contained within a single genus.

References

Sources

 
 
 
 
 
 
 

 
Lagomorphs
Lagomorphs